McMahen is a surname. Notable people with the surname include:

Noel McMahen (born 1926), Australian rules footballer and coach
Royce L. McMahen (1923-1999), American veterinarian and sheriff
Ryan McMahen (born 1982), American soccer player

See also 
 McMahan
 McMahon
 McMann